Dodsley  is a surname. Notable people with the surname include:

Christopher Dodsley (born 1978), English cricketer
Edward Dodsley Barrow (1867–1956), Canadian politician
James Dodsley (1724–1797), English bookseller, brother of Robert
Robert Dodsley (1704–1764), English writer